The 2015–16 Maryland Eastern Shore Hawks men's basketball team represented the University of Maryland Eastern Shore during the 2015–16 NCAA Division I men's basketball season. The Hawks, led by second year head coach Bobby Collins, played their home games at the Hytche Athletic Center and were members of the Mid-Eastern Athletic Conference. They finished the season 10–22, 7–9 in MEAC play to finish in a three way tie for sixth place. They lost in the first round of the MEAC tournament to Morgan State.

Roster

Schedule
Source:

|-
!colspan=9 style="background:#800000; color:white;"| Regular season

|-
!colspan=9 style="background:#800000; color:white;"|  MEAC tournament

References

Maryland Eastern Shore Hawks men's basketball seasons
Maryland Eastern Shore